Aguinaldo Fonseca (22 September 1922; Mindelo, Cape Verde – 24 January 2014; Lisbon, Portugal) was a Cape Verdean poet.

Biography
Aguinaldo Fonseca was born in Mindelo, capital of the island of São Vicente on 22 September 1922.

Aguinaldo Fonseca moved to Lisbon in 1945 and published several poems in different Portuguese journals.

He first collaborated on the journal Claridade in 1945 and later on the seminary Mundo Literário (World of Literature) (1946-1948).

He was later known as "the forgotten poet", even they were published in the "Linha do Horizonte" collection in 1951, seven years later, reunited in a selection of poems in a cultural supplement "Notícias de Cabo Verde", he portrayed Michel Laban, an Algerian born French investigator who studied in Lusophony literature, that author died in Paris in December 2008.

His poems redrawn in civic ardor and firmly exposed to social injustice as cited in the Great Soviet Encyclopedia in 1979 when it translated into Russian.

One of his poem can be found on the CD Poesia de Cabo Verde e Sete Poemas de Sebastião da Gama (2007) by Afonso Dias.

Poems
Mãe negra
Canção dos rapazes da ilha

References

Further reading
João Alves das Neves Poetas e Contistas africanos de expressão portuguêsa. Cabo verde-Guiné-São Tomé e Principe-Angola-Moçambique, Brasiliense, São Paulo, 1963, p. 18
Ferreira, Manuel No reino de Caliban : antologia panorâmica da poesia africana de expressão portuguesa, vol. 1. Cabo Verde e Guiné-Bissau, Seara Nova, Lisbonne, 1975, p. 158
Janheinz Jahn, Ulla Schild and Almut Nordmann Seiler. Who's who in African literature: biographies, works, commentaries. — 1972.
Veiga, Manuel Insularité et littérature aux îles du Cap-Vert (translated into Portuguese by Elisa Silva Andrade), Karthala, Paris, 1997, p. 266

External links
 Poems by Aguinaldo Fonseca 

Cape Verdean poets
1922 births
2014 deaths
20th-century poets
People from Mindelo